Pope Dionysius was the bishop of Rome from 22 July 259 to his death on  26 December 268. His task was to reorganize the Roman church, after the persecutions of Emperor Valerian I and the edict of toleration by his successor Gallienus. He also helped rebuild the churches of Cappadocia, devastated by the marauding Goths.

Pontificate
Dionysius may have been born in Magna Græcia, but this has not been verified. He was elected pope in 259, after the martyrdom of Sixtus II in 258. The Holy See had been vacant for nearly a year due to difficulty in electing a new pope during the violent persecution which Christians faced. When the persecution had begun to subside, Dionysius was raised to the office of Bishop of Rome. Emperor Valerian I, who had led the persecution, was captured and killed by the King of Persia in 260. The new emperor, Gallienus, issued an edict of toleration, restoring the churches, cemeteries and other properties it had held, leading to the nearly 40-year "Little Peace of the Church". To the new pope fell the task of reorganizing the Roman church, which had fallen into great disorder.  On the protest of some of the faithful at Alexandria, he demanded from the bishop of Alexandria, also called Dionysius, explanations concerning his doctrine regarding the relation of God to the Logos, which was satisfied.

Pope Dionysius sent large sums of money to the churches of Cappadocia, which had been devastated by the marauding Goths, to rebuild and to ransom those held captive.  He brought order to the church and procured a peace after Emperor Gallienus issued an edict of toleration which was to last until 303. He died on 26 December 268.

In art, he is portrayed in papal vestments, along with a book.

See also

List of popes
List of Catholic saints

Notes

References

Literature

External links

Opera Omnia
 
 Collected works by Migne Patrologia Latina

268 deaths
3rd-century Christian saints
3rd-century Romans
Greek popes
Greek Roman Catholics
Papal saints
Popes
Year of birth unknown
3rd-century popes